Daniel Gabriel Ávila Ruiz (born 3 August 1971) is a Mexican politician affiliated with the PAN. He currently serves as Senator of the LXII Legislature of the Mexican Congress representing Yucatán. He also served as Deputy during the LXI Legislature.

References

1971 births
Living people
Politicians from Yucatán (state)
Members of the Senate of the Republic (Mexico)
Members of the Chamber of Deputies (Mexico)
National Action Party (Mexico) politicians
21st-century Mexican politicians
Universidad Autónoma de Yucatán alumni
Members of the Congress of Yucatán
People from Tizimín
Senators of the LXII and LXIII Legislatures of Mexico